LaDarius Markeis Gunter Sr. (born May 13, 1992) is an American football cornerback who is currently a free agent. He played college football at the University of Miami, and was signed by the Green Bay Packers of the National Football League (NFL) as an undrafted free agent in 2015. Gunter also spent time in the NFL with the Carolina Panthers, the Orlando Apollos of the Alliance of American Football (AAF), and the DC Defenders of the XFL.

Early years
Gunter attended Jefferson Davis High School in Montgomery, Alabama, participating in football and track and field. He played cornerback, safety, and outside linebacker for the Volunteers. Gunter also set personal records of 22.93 in the 200 and 1:03.45 in the 400 meters. However, he was unable to go to a top football program out of high school due to low test scores.

College career
Gunter attended Fort Scott Community College for two years before transferring to the University of Miami. During his first year at Miami in 2012, Gunter played in 12 games with five starts. He recorded 27 tackles and one interception. As a junior in 2013, Gunter started all 13 games. He finished with 46 tackles and three interceptions. As a senior in 2014, he again started all 13 games and had 28 tackles and two interceptions.

Professional career

Green Bay Packers
After going undrafted in the 2015 NFL Draft, Gunter signed with the Green Bay Packers on May 8, 2015. He recorded eight tackles and an interception in the preseason, earning him a spot on the Packers' 53-man roster. Gunter made his NFL debut on September 28, 2015, against the Kansas City Chiefs.

On September 18, 2016, Gunter made his first NFL start, opening against the Minnesota Vikings in place of injured Sam Shields. He posted his first career forced fumble, but it was recovered by the Vikings. The Packers finished the season with a record of 10-6 and were the 2016 NFC North Champs. In the NFC Wild Card round against the New York Giants, Gunter was credited for containing Odell Beckham Jr to only four catches for 28 yards.

On September 12, 2017, Gunter was released by the Packers.

Carolina Panthers
On September 13, 2017, Gunter was claimed off waivers by the Carolina Panthers.

On March 26, 2018, Gunter re-signed with the Panthers. On August 31, 2018, Gunter was released.

Orlando Apollos
Gunter joined the Orlando Apollos of the Alliance of American Football for the team's inaugural spring 2019 season. The league ceased operations in April 2019.

DC Defenders
Gunter was drafted in the 10th round during phase four in the 2020 XFL Draft by the DC Defenders. He was released during mini-camp in December 2019.

NFL career statistics
Regular season

Postseason

References

External links
Green Bay Packers bio

1992 births
Living people
Players of American football from Montgomery, Alabama
American football safeties
American football cornerbacks
Fort Scott Greyhounds football players
Miami Hurricanes football players
Green Bay Packers players
Carolina Panthers players
Orlando Apollos players
DC Defenders players